Battle of the Philippines may refer to several wars, military campaigns, and major battles which have been fought in the Philippine Islands, including:

Spanish conquest
Battle of Bangkusay Channel
1582 Cagayan battles
Tondo Conspiracy
Bankaw revolt
Battle of Puerto de Cavite
Philippine revolts against Spain
The Philippine Revolution (1896–98), called the "Tagalog War" by the Spanish, a military conflict between the people of the Philippines and the Spanish colonial authorities
Battle of San Mateo and Montalban
Battle of San Francisco de Malabon
Battle of San Juan del Monte
Kawit revolt
Battle of Sambat
Battle of Pateros
Battle of Camalig
Battles of Batangas
Battle of Talisay
Battle of Pasong Tamo
Battle of Imus
Battle of Binakayan-Dalahican
Battle of Kakarong de Sili
Battle of Perez Dasmariñas
Cry of Tarlac
Battle of Zapote Bridge (1897)
Battle of Calamba
Battle of Tayabas
Battle of Tres de Abril
Siege of Zamboanga
Battle of Alapan
Negros Revolution
Battles of Manila (disambiguation)
The Battle of Manila Bay (1898) during the Spanish–American War
The Philippine–American War (1899–1902), an armed conflict between the Philippines and the United States
Battle of Caloocan
Battle of Tirad Pass
Battle of Santo Tomas
Battle of Cagayan de Misamis
Battle of Makahambus Hill
Capture of Malolos
Battle of Zapote River
Battle of Quingua
Battle of Calumpit
Battle of Olongapo
Battle of Pagsanjan
Battle of Paete
Battle of Santa Cruz (1899)
Battle of Paye
Battle of Mabitac
Battle of Pulang Lupa
Battle of Agusan Hill
Battle of Balangiga
Battle of Siranaya
The Philippines campaign (1941–1942), the conquest of the Philippine Islands by the Japanese Empire during World War II in December '41 – May '42, including these significant battles:
The Battle of Bataan on Luzon Island
The Battle of Corregidor of 1942 on Corregidor Island in Manila Bay
Japanese invasion of Davao
The Philippines campaign (1944–1945), the long American and Filipino land, sea, and aviation campaigns of October '44 through August '45. Major battles in this campaign included:
Battle of the Philippine Sea
Raid at Cabanatuan
The U.S. Army's and Philippine Army's Battle of Leyte (October – November '44)
The Naval Battle of Leyte Gulf (October '44)
The Naval Battle of Surigao Strait (October '44)
The Naval Battle off Samar (October '44)
Battle of Bessang Pass
The U.S. Army's and Philippine Army's Battle of Mindoro
The U.S. Army's Invasion of Lingayen Gulf (January '45)
Battle of Samar
The U.S. Army's and Philippine Army's Battle of Luzon
The Battle of Corregidor (1945) on Corregidor Island in Manila Bay
The U.S. Army's and Philippine Army's Battle of Manila (1945)
The U.S. Army's and Philippine Army's Battle of the Visayas
The U.S. Army's and Philippine Army's Battle of Mindanao
Battle of Davao
Battle of Mindoro
Invasion of Palawan
Zamboanga Siege 2013
2017 Bohol clashes
The Battle of Marawi May-October 2017